Battleground 8: Prelude to Waterloo is a 1997 computer wargame developed and published by TalonSoft. It is the eighth entry in the Battleground series.

Gameplay
Battleground 8: Prelude to Waterloo is a computer wargame that simulates military conflict during the Napoleonic Wars.

Development
Battleground 8: Prelude to Waterloo is the eighth game in the Battleground series. It was developed and published by TalonSoft, and was originally planned as an expansion pack for Battleground 3: Waterloo. Scott Udell of Computer Games Strategy Plus reported that "the popularity of that game and the demand for more Napoleonic coverage [led] TalonSoft ... to flush it out into a full release." It was announced in November 1996 as one of the next two titles in the Battleground series, alongside Battleground 7: Bull Run. Prelude to Waterloo shipped to retailers on September 15, 1997. At the time, TalonSoft announced it as the final game in the Battleground series.

Reception

Mark McIntosh of Computer Games Strategy Plus gave Prelude to Waterloo a rave review, calling it "without a doubt the best game TalonSoft has produced" in the Battleground series. Computer Gaming Worlds Bob Proctor was also positive: he dubbed it "a very good game" despite the presence of "more than a few" small flaws.

Legacy
Although Prelude to Waterloo was announced as the final game in the Battleground series, it received a sequel in 1999, under the title Battleground 9: Chickamauga.

References

1997 video games
Computer wargames
Napoleonic Wars video games
Turn-based strategy video games
Video games developed in the United States
Windows games
Windows-only games
TalonSoft games
Multiplayer and single-player video games